The Compatriot Party (Yurddaş Partiyası) is a political party in Azerbaijan.

At the last elections (November 5, 2000 and January 7, 2001), the party won 1 out of 125 seats.

The first chairman of the party was Mais Safarli until 2020 .

References
The World Factbook

Political parties in Azerbaijan
Political parties with year of establishment missing